Praneeth Kumar (born 13 October 1989) is an Indian former cricketer. He played six List A matches for Hyderabad between 2013 and 2014.

See also
 List of Hyderabad cricketers

References

External links
 

1989 births
Living people
Indian cricketers
Hyderabad cricketers
Cricketers from Hyderabad, India